Rescue 911 is an informational docudrama television series that premiered on CBS on April 18, 1989, and ended on August 27, 1996. The series was hosted by William Shatner and featured reenactments (and occasionally real footage) of emergencies that often involved calls to 911.

Though never intended as a teaching tool, various viewers used the knowledge they obtained watching the show. Two specials, titled 100 Lives Saved and 200 Lives Saved, were dedicated to these viewers who had written to CBS with their stories on how the knowledge they obtained watching the show allowed them to save the life of someone else. At least 350 lives have been saved as a result of what viewers learned from watching it. The show's popularity coincided with the widespread adoption of the 911 emergency system, replacing standalone police and fire numbers that would vary from municipality to municipality. The number is now universally understood in the United States and Canada to be the number dialed for emergency assistance nationwide.

At its height, the show was adapted in 45 countries (with their own 911 equivalent showcased).

Broadcast history

Conception and early airing
The idea for Rescue 911 was conceived in early 1989 by then-president of CBS Entertainment Kim LeMasters when he heard a recording of a dramatic 911 call on Charles Osgood's radio show while driving to work. LeMasters discussed the idea of creating a television program centered on actual 911 recordings with in-house production head Norman Powell, who in turn hired documentary producer Arnold Shapiro to produce three television specials. LeMasters initially suggested that Leonard Nimoy should host the show, but Shapiro felt that William Shatner would be a better fit due to his role as a police officer on the TV series T. J. Hooker.
 
The first Rescue 911 special aired on April 18, 1989, and included a segment ("Arlington") featuring the 911 recording that had given LeMasters the idea for the show. A second special aired on May 9, 1989. Both specials received high ratings, prompting CBS to pick up Rescue 911 for the 1989 fall season. It began airing as a regular series on September 5, 1989, and ran for 7 seasons, with the last new episode airing on August 27, 1996. The last episode to air on CBS (a repeat) aired on September 3, 1996.

Though it aired Tuesdays at 8:00 PM for most of its run, Rescue 911 occasionally aired on other nights either as an additional episode shown during that week, or a temporary rearrangement to make room for another program.

Syndication
In 1993, The Family Channel began airing reruns, but it was removed from the lineup when the Family Channel became the FOX Family Channel in August 1998. 

In 1993, a reformatted version (see below) of the show was sold into off-network syndication. The syndicated version continued to air both in the U.S. and internationally long after the show's cancellation, but it had not aired in the U.S. since July 2005. It was shown on the Justice Network from October 2017 to November 2019, and on GetTV from August 2019 to May 2020. The show currently has its own channel on Pluto TV, where it airs 24 hours a day.

The following networks have aired the show in the syndicated format:

Numerous local affiliates
The Family Channel (also showed the original format)
Odyssey/The Hallmark Channel 
Discovery Health Channel
Reality TV/Zone Reality 
Justice Network/True Crime Network
GetTV
Pluto TV
Living
CI (Australia)
AXN
Uganda Broadcasting Corporation (Uganda)
RPN (Philippines), under partnership with Silverstar Communications

Potential revival
In October 2018, Variety announced that CBS Television Studios was developing a two-hour Rescue 911 reboot with William Shatner slated to return as host. The reboot would have featured a live format similar to that of Live PD showing rescuers responding to calls in real time (in the original versions, only a small portion of the segments were done as such and were pre-recorded). In February 2020, Shatner said in a radio interview that the reboot had not moved forward because CBS could not work out the logistical difficulties of obtaining consent from accident victims to be filmed live as the events unfolded.

Seasonal timeslots/ratings

Additional/alternate timeslots
 Season 2: Wednesday, 8 p.m.: April 1990 (in addition to Tuesday at 8 p.m.)
 Season 3: Friday, 8 p.m.: January–February 1992 (in addition to Tuesday at 8 p.m.)
 Season 7: Tuesday, 8 p.m.: September 1995, August–September 1996 (with the majority of the rest of the season airing on Thursdays at 9 P.M.)

Ratings by episode

Format

Original format
When the show aired on CBS, episodes normally ran 60 minutes and featured four stories, although some episodes featured three or five stories. Three-story episodes were common during the second and third seasons, but became less common during the later seasons.

Because the show was paired with The CBS Tuesday Night Movie for most of its run, episodes with irregular running times were occasionally created to accommodate movies that didn't fit the regular two-hour time slot. Such episodes usually ran 30 minutes and contained two stories. Others included a 90-minute episode, a 50-minute episode, a 45-minute episode, and a 15-minute episode containing only one story.

From seasons one through five, an opening disclaimer was shown before each episode. Shatner's voice was heard saying:   In a few of the early episodes, the last sentence of the disclaimer said: 

In seasons six and seven, three segments from the episode were previewed in place of the disclaimer, and a shortened version of the original introduction was shown. Reruns from earlier seasons that aired after September 1994 had their old introductions replaced by the new version of the introduction.

When reruns aired on The Family Channel, episodes were edited for running time, censored for profanity and negative religious references, and graphic footage was sometimes cut out. Family initially showed the opening disclaimer at the beginning of the episodes, but it was later replaced with a short teaser that previewed one or two segments from the episode. Season six episodes that aired on Family had their introductions replaced with the original introduction, although the opening credits were not changed accordingly and were sometimes incorrect. Season seven episodes were never shown on Family.

Syndicated format
The syndicated version of the show ran 30 minutes and typically included two stories, although a few episodes contained one long-running story. Some syndicated episodes featured stories that began on one episode and concluded on the next, which was never done in the show's original format. These syndicated episodes contained no new material; they consisted entirely of stories taken from episodes that aired in the original format. Stories featured on syndicated episodes were often edited for running time, omitting short scenes that were shown in the original broadcasts. Three hundred syndicated episodes were produced, and they featured segments from the first six seasons of the show.

Stories featured

Presentation
Shatner would introduce episodes (and usually, all segments within them) from inside 911 dispatch centers or fire stations, or next to police cars and/or ambulances. He would end episodes from such locations as well. In addition, all segments included voiceover narration by Shatner, interview clips with the people involved and, in many cases, the actual recorded 911 call. Most segments were about 9 to 13 minutes in running time, although some ran shorter, particularly on five-segment episodes, and a few were longer in duration. Usually, the first segment of an episode included a commercial break shortly after the incident itself unfolded, and after the break Shatner would usually pick up again from the station the segment was introduced.

Unless otherwise specified, stories were presented in the form of re-enactments. Occasionally, recorded video footage of all or part of the event itself (usually amateur video or television news coverage) would be used. In these instances, Shatner would mention that a particular amount of footage was taped "as events unfolded" in the opening to a segment in which recorded footage was included. Many re-enactments required complex presentation, such as the recreation of house fires, automobile accidents, police chases, explosions, pregnant women in labor, and even natural disasters.

Some stories took place in the form of a documentary. In these stories, the show's camera crews would ride along with paramedics or police, or wait in hospitals and film whatever happened to unfold. These stories usually involved more than one event in a single segment at the same medical facility. One such story was the Charles Stuart murder case, which happened during a ride-along with Boston EMS.

In the show's early seasons, Shatner would close episodes with a statement advising viewers to learn the emergency numbers in their area and to post them by each phone, as not all areas had the 911 system back then. Later in its run, however, the closing statements focused on other lifesaving tips such as learning various first aid techniques, among other things.

Each episode would end with Shatner making some variation of the following statement:

Situations
Crimes, automobile accidents, medical emergencies, fires, choking/asphyxiation, and miscellaneous injuries were the most common situations presented on the show. Other situations commonly presented on it included technical rescues, near-drownings, childbirth, animal rescues, search and rescue situations, and aircraft-related emergencies.  Occasionally, stories involving gas leaks, electrocutions, suicide attempts, scuba diving accidents, drug overdoses, train-related accidents, allergic reactions, and natural disasters were also presented.

Although the show mostly featured serious emergencies, it occasionally featured humorous stories of non life-threatening situations and false alarms. Examples included a burglar who got stuck upside-down when he tried to enter a house through the chimney, a young boy who got stuck in a laundry chute while playing hide-and-seek, a young boy whose tongue froze to the inside of a freezer while he attempted to get ice cream, a man who got a plaster mask stuck on his face, a dog that stepped on the 911 speed dial button after getting tangled in the phone cord (although it was in danger of being strangled), a woman who called 911 when she mistook her parents' new mannequin for an intruder, a boy who got his tongue stuck in a canteen, a woman who got trapped in her apartment behind a mattress, and a man who woke up to a break-in at his house, only to discover the burglar was a bobcat.

A few segments featured on the show had previously gained national news coverage. These incidents included the New Year's Eve 1986 fire at Puerto Rico's DuPont Plaza Hotel, the 1987 Amtrak train wreck in Maryland, two segments on Hurricane Hugo, the June 1990 Ohio tornado, the Stuart murder case, the Salt Lake City Public Library hostage incident, and the Oklahoma City bombing.

Deaths

Although the majority of stories featured ended with all lives being saved, there were some exceptions in which one or more victims died. Such occurrences became exceedingly rare later in Rescue 911s run, and usually occurred in documentary segments or in those reenacting multiple casualty incidents in which other victims survived. This list does not include segments where criminals were killed, either directly or indirectly, as a result of the incident with no other deaths.

International versions
A British version called 999 (after the UK emergency telephone number) premiered in 1992 and ran on BBC One until 2003, hosted by journalist and newsreader Michael Buerk.

In New Zealand, TV2 began screening the first season of Rescue 911 in 1991 and subsequent seasons following this. At the start of each episode, the network would display a reminder to viewers that the emergency number in New Zealand is 111. In 1992, with the permission of CBS, the show was renamed to Rescue 111 in New Zealand. This was done following reports of New Zealanders calling 911 in emergencies instead of 111. The show's starting was shortened with a Rescue 111 title replacing the Rescue 911 title. Its format remained the same, however, with Shatner still addressing the show as Rescue 911 along with all stories mentioning calling 911. He also recorded a special outro for the show reminding viewers of New Zealand's emergency number. When the final series screened in 1996, the show was simply called Rescue.

Featured episodes from the U.S. version of Rescue 911 were dubbed over in Spanish by Venezuelan distributor Etcétera Group. It aired in Mexico from 1993 to at least 1996 on the TV Azteca network, and in Ecuador from 1994 to 2000 on RTS. It currently airs on Oromar Televisión.

German network RTL started its own version with a mix of cases from Germany and the US in 1992. The show ran for over 14 years, with the last episode broadcast on August 27, 2006, and from 1998 to 2001 also aired the offshoot Notruf Täglich. In August 2009, the format was briefly revived as Helfen Sie Mir!.

Hungarian channel RTL Klub ran its own version from May 1, 1998, until August 27, 1999, hosted by György Cserhalmi. Each episode contained 2 cases from Rescue 911, one from Germany's Notruf, and one original story.

Merchandise

Home media
In Rescue 911s early seasons on CBS, ads were shown after the end credits of every episode that gave an 800 number viewers could call to order a copy of that night's episode. This ad was dropped in later seasons.

On May 27, 1997, "Rescue 911: World's Greatest Rescues" was released on VHS. This video featured stories of rescue attempts from around the world; segments were taken from both the U.S. and international versions of the show. The segments on the video were edited for running time, and the original narration on all segments (including those originally narrated by Shatner) were dubbed over by an uncredited narrator. The two stories taken from the U.S. version were about a New Zealand girl pinned beneath a flaming gasoline tanker (season three, episode 25) and the infamous documentary of the Stuart murder case in Boston, Massachusetts (season one, episode 20). The other stories, taken from international versions of the show, were about a Belgian family trapped in a car hanging precariously from a high overpass, a Russian hostage crisis in which a terrorist held two women captive, an Austrian skier who fell into an underground glacier river, and a French mother who was forced to drop her two children 60 feet from a burning apartment to bystanders below (the latter segment is not included on some versions of the video).

Books
Several books were written that recounted stories featured on Rescue 911:
Rescue 911 Extraordinary Stories by Linda Maron
Rescue 911 Kid Heroes by Alison Hendrie
Rescue 911 Amazing Rescues by Alison Hendrie
Rescue 911 Humorous Rescues by R. M. Ferrara
Rescue 911 Animal Rescues by R. M. Ferrara
The Rescue 911 Family First Aid & Emergency Care Book by Julie Motz

Toys and games
Model kits: In 1993, AMT-ERTL released three Rescue 911 themed emergency vehicle model kits. Each of the three kits contained decals with the Rescue 911 logo, and each box had on its side panel a synopsis of a relevant story from Rescue 911. These models were:
Police car (1990 Ford Taurus). The side panel contained a synopsis of "911 Sister Abduction", in which a police officer rescued a six-year-old girl who was kidnapped from her back yard.
Rescue ambulance (Dodge). The side panel contained a synopsis of "911 Cribbage Choke", in which paramedics performed a risky procedure on board an ambulance to save a young boy choking on a cribbage piece.
Rescue helicopter (Civilian Medical Rescue Helicopter). The side panel contained a synopsis of "The Helicopter Horse", in which an injured horse was lifted out of a canyon by helicopter.

Squirt Extinguisher: In 1993, JA-RU, Inc. released a toy fire extinguisher water squirter.
Handheld game: In 1993, Micro Games of America released a handheld game based on the show. The objective of the game is to help the firefighter extinguish the fire in the building and the electrical room while avoiding falling debris.
MatchBox Rescue 911 themed cars Pacecar, medic's car, and fire observer van and police van along with a search and rescue-themed vehicles.
Slot car sets: In 1993, Marchon, Inc. released 2 slot car sets called "Rescue 911 Chopper Rescue" and "Rescue 911 Police Pursuit". The Chopper Rescue set included two slot cars (a fire truck and a police jeep) and a complete racetrack. A unique feature of this track was that it allowed racers to jump their cars over a canyon with the aid of a magnetic helicopter. The Police Pursuit set included two slot cars (a sports car and a police car) and a battery powered racetrack which included an automatic lap counter.
Emergency Communications Vehicle: In 1993, Marchon, Inc. released a toy battery-powered police car which included a remote control intercom.

Pinball machine

In May 1994, Premier Technologies, trade-name Gottlieb, released a Rescue 911 pinball machine. It featured a helicopter that magnetically captured the ball as well as a red revolving light on the backbox. In March 2016, it was released in The Pinball Arcade for PC, Android mobile devices and iOS.

Awards

References

External links
 

1980s American medical television series
1990s American medical television series
1989 American television series debuts
1996 American television series endings
Television series by 20th Century Fox Television
Television series by CBS Studios
Television series featuring reenactments
CBS original programming
American non-fiction television series
Television shows filmed in Utah
Television series by MTM Enterprises